Tomas Pacheco (born November 4, 1946) is an American folk singer-songwriter and guitarist.

Discography

Albums 
1965 	Turn Away from the Storm
1971 	Pacheco & Alexander
1976 	Swallowed Up in the Great American Heartland
1976 	The Outsider
1989 	Eagle in the Rain
1991 	Sunflowers & Scarecrows
1992 	Tales from the Red Lake
1993 	Big Storm Comin''' (with Steinar Albrigtsen), EU #85, NO #2
1994 	Luck of Angels1995 	Bluefields1997 	Woodstock Winter (with Members From The Band)
1998 	Bare Bones & Barbed Wire1999 	The Lost American Songwriter (Bare Bones II)
2000 	Nobodies (with Steinar Albrigtsen), NO #15
2002 	 There Was a Time2003 	 Year of the Big Wind 
2005 	 13 Stones (Bare Bones IV)
2005 	Rebel Spring2006 	 Bloodlines2007 	 The Secret Hits, The Best of Tom Pacheco Vol. 12008 	Railroad Rainbows & Talking Blues2010 	 I'll Leave a Light for You2011 	 The Best of Tom Pacheco, The Secret Hits Vol. 2 Further reading 
  Capsule review of Pacheco's 1976 LP Swallowed Up in the Great American Heartland''.

References

External links 
Official site

1946 births
Living people
American male guitarists
American folk guitarists
20th-century American guitarists
20th-century American male musicians
American male singer-songwriters